José Federico de Carvajal Pérez (14 March 1930 – 13 June 2015) was a Spanish lawyer and politician, member of the Spanish Socialist Workers' Party and President of the Spanish Senate from 1982 to 1989.

References

1930 births
Presidents of the Senate of Spain
Spanish Socialist Workers' Party politicians
2015 deaths